Jean-Augustin de Foresta (1520-1588) was a French aristocrat, landowner and lawyer. He served as the Président à mortier of the Parliament of Aix-en-Provence in 1554, and as its First President from 1557 to 1564.

Biography

Early life
Jean-Augustin de Foresta was born in 1520. His father, Christophe de Foresta, was an Advisor in the Parliament of Aix-en-Provence.

Career
He inherited the Baronetcy of Trets.

He served as the President a mortier of the Parliament of Aix-en-Provence in 1554, and then as its First President from 1557 to 1564.

Personal life
In 1553, he married Anne d'Albertas, daughter of Amiel (or Amédée) d'Albertas, Lord of Villecroze and First Consul of Marseille, and Françoise Sabateriis. They had five children:
Christophe II de Foresta (1555-unknown). He married the Marquess de Covet de Marignane.
François de Foresta (1557-1612). He married Marguerite de Glandeves.
Jean-Paul I de Foresta (1564-unknown). He married Marguerite de Lenche.
Gaspard de Foresta. He married Sibylle Bernard.
Amiel de Foresta.

Death and legacy
He died on 24 October 1588 and was buried in the Couvent des Observantins in Aix. His grandson, Jean-Augustin Foresta de la Roquette, served as the President a mortier of the Parliament of Aix-en-Provence in 1630.

References

1520 births
1588 deaths
People from Aix-en-Provence
16th-century French lawyers
Provencal nobility